Sete Cidades National Park is a national park in the state of Piauí, Brazil.

Location

The Sete Cidades National Park is divided between the municipalities of Brasileira (26.21%) and Piracuruca (73.77%) in the state of Piauí.
The park is surrounded by the  Serra da Ibiapaba Environmental Protection Area, created in 1996.

History

The Sete Cidades National Park was created by decree 50.744 of 8 June 1961 by Jânio Quadros, president of Brazil.
The management plan was published, but not officially formalized, on 31 December 1978.
Ordnance 126 of 14 December 2010 created the consultative council.

Environment

The park contains arid savanna forest (babassu forests] and areas of contact between savanna, arid savanna, and seasonal forest.
It protects an important geological formation and conserves water resources in a dry region.
The geological monuments are the main attraction.
The park also has some pre-historic cave paintings and inscriptions.

Gallery

Notes

Sources

National parks of Brazil
Protected areas of Piauí
Protected areas established in 1961
1961 establishments in Brazil
Caatinga